The men's 10,000 metres event at the 2005 European Athletics U23 Championships was held in Erfurt, Germany, at Steigerwaldstadion on 15 July.

Medalists

Results

Final
15 July

Participation
According to an unofficial count, 20 athletes from 14 countries participated in the event.

 (1)
 (1)
 (2)
 (1)
 (1)
 (3)
 (1)
 (1)
 (1)
 (1)
 (2)
 (2)
 (2)
 (1)

References

10000 metres
10,000 metres at the European Athletics U23 Championships